One-eyed monster may refer to:

 One-eyed monster, a euphemism for the human penis
 One-Eyed Monster (film), a 2008 sci-fi/horror comedy film starring Ron Jeremy
 Monsters with one eye